Lydia Koyonda  (born 29 May 1974) is a Nigerian footballer who played as a goalkeeper for the Nigeria women's national football team. She was part of the team at the inaugural 1991 FIFA Women's World Cup. At the club level, she played for Ufuoma Babes in Nigeria.

References

External links
 

1974 births
Living people
Nigerian women's footballers
Nigeria women's international footballers
Place of birth missing (living people)
1991 FIFA Women's World Cup players
Women's association football goalkeepers